The Reach Academy Feltham is an all-through free school which opened in Feltham in the London Borough of Hounslow in 2012.

References

External links

Free schools in London
Secondary schools in the London Borough of Hounslow
Primary schools in the London Borough of Hounslow
Educational institutions established in 2012
2012 establishments in England